Sushila Kerketta (27 April 1939 – 19 October 2009) was a member of the Bihar Vidhan Sabha from 1985 to 2000 and also in Lok sabha from Khunti.

She held several important portfolios in the Bihar government. She was minister of state for irrigation (independent charge) from 1985 to 1988. She was promoted to cabinet rank in 1989 and headed mines and geology and the food and civil supplies departments.

She represented the Khunti constituency of Jharkhand and was a member of the Indian National Congress. She was also a lecturer in the Birsa College, Khunti and later went on to become its principal.

Early life and education 

Sushila Kerketta was born on 27 April 1939 in Ranchi, Bihar to Prabhudayal Marki and Maini Marki. She did a bachelor in education and a masters in philosophy from St. Xavier's College, Ranchi.

Later she was married to Shri Nottrot Kerketta on 28 Dec. 1970 and had three sons and two daughters named Roshan, Praween, Naveen, Sandhya and Asha.

Personal interests 

Kerketta was a social worker and teacher who regularly visited local villages and promoted such enterprises as local hand looms. Her sports interests included archery, football and hockey. She led the Jharkhand Women Hockey Association, Mahila Hockey Association, Chotanagpur, and the Bihar Women Hockey Association.

Positions held 

 1985–2000 Member, Bihar Legislative Assembly (three terms)
 1985–88 Minister of State, (Independent Charge), Irrigation, Government of Bihar
 1988–89 Cabinet Minister, Rural Development, Food and Civil Supply, Government of Bihar
 1989–90 Cabinet Minister, Mines and Geology, Government of Bihar
 1990–95 Co-ordinator, Public Accounts Committee, Bihar Legislative Assembly; Co-ordinator, Nivadan Committee, Bihar Legislative Assembly
 1990–2000 Deputy Leader, Congress Party, Bihar Legislative Assembly; Chairman, Child & Woman Development Committee (two terms)
 2004 Elected to 14th Lok Sabha; Member, Committee on Empowerment of Women; Member, Committee on Labour
 16 August 2006 Member, Committee on Empowerment of Women
 5 August 2007 Member, Standing Committee on Labour

Personal life 

She married Nottrott Kerketta on 28 December 1970 and later had three sons and two daughters. Nottrot preceded her in death.

Kerketta died in Ranchi on 19 December 2009 following a heart attack. She was 70 and is survived by three sons and a daughter.

Kerketta had been staying with her eldest son Roshan Kumar Surin and had not been keeping well for the last few weeks. She suffered a heart attack at noon and was rushed to the nearby Raj Hospital by her family, where efforts to save her failed.

References 

1939 births
2009 deaths
Indian National Congress politicians from Jharkhand
People from Khunti district
India MPs 2004–2009
Lok Sabha members from Jharkhand
Women in Jharkhand politics
20th-century Indian women politicians
20th-century Indian politicians
21st-century Indian women politicians
21st-century Indian politicians
Women members of the Lok Sabha